The peerages in the United Kingdom are a legal system comprising both hereditary and lifetime titles, composed of various noble ranks, and forming a constituent part of the British honours system. The term peerage can be used both collectively to refer to the entire body of nobles (or a subdivision thereof), and individually to refer to a specific title (modern English language-style using an initial capital in the latter case but not the former). British peerage title holders are termed peers of the Realm. The peerage's fundamental roles are ones of government, peers being eligible (although formerly entitled) to a seat in the House of Lords, and of meritocracy, the receiving of any peerage being the highest of British honours (with the receiving of a more traditional hereditary peerage naturally holding more weight than that of a more modern, and less highly regarded, life peerage). In the UK, five peerages or peerage divisions co-exist, namely:
 The Peerage of England – titles created by the kings and queens of England before the Acts of Union in 1707.
 The Peerage of Scotland – titles created by the kings and queens of Scotland before 1707.
 The Peerage of Great Britain – titles created for the Kingdom of Great Britain between 1707 and 1801.
 The Peerage of Ireland – titles created for the Kingdom of Ireland before the Acts of Union in 1801, and some titles created later.
 The Peerage of the United Kingdom – most titles created since 1801 to the present.

Peerages are created by the British monarch, like all Crown honours, being affirmed by letters patent affixed with the Great Seal of the Realm. His Majesty's Government in the United Kingdom makes recommendations to the Sovereign concerning who should be elevated to the peerage, after external vetting by the House of Lords Appointments Commission. Under present custom, the only new hereditary peerages granted are to members of the royal family; the last non-royal awardees of hereditary titles were in the Thatcher era. Since then, ruling parties have refrained from recommending any others to be elevated although there is nothing preventing future governments from doing so.

Labour, elected to power in 1997, sought to remove all of the seats in the House of Lords reserved for hereditary peers, but Prime Minister Tony Blair relented by allowing 92 members to remain by legislation enacted in 1999. The House of Lords' purpose is now that of a revising legislative chamber, scrutinising and potentially changing proposed Parliamentary Bills before their enactment. Its membership for the most part comprises life peers, created under the Life Peerages Act 1958, which includes those who can add value in specific areas of expertise in parliamentary debates, as well as former MPs and other political appointees from respective political parties.

The Sovereign, traditionally the fount of honour, cannot hold a British peerage (although the British Sovereign, whether male or female, is informally accorded the style of 'Duke of Lancaster'). All British subjects who were neither Royal nor Peers of the Realm were previously termed Commoners, regardless of wealth or other social factors; thus all members of a peer's family, with the exception of a wife or unmarried widow, are (technically) commoners too; the British system thus differs fundamentally from continental European versions, where entire families, rather than individuals, were ennobled. Nobility in Britain is based on title rather than bloodline, and correspondingly The Princess Royal (Princess Anne) who enjoys Royal status as daughter of Queen Elizabeth II, opted for her children to be Commoners by refusing offers of titles, despite their being grandchildren of the Sovereign (qv. Peter Phillips and Zara Tindall).

Certain personal privileges are afforded to all peers and peeresses, but the main distinction of a peerage nowadays, apart from access to the House of Lords for life peers and some hereditary peers, is the title and style thereby accorded. Succession claims to existing hereditary peerages are regulated by the House of Lords Committee for Privileges and Conduct and administered by The Crown Office.

Baronage evolution 

The modern-day parliamentary peerage is a continuation of the renamed medieval baronage system which existed in feudal times. The requirement of attending Parliament was both a liability and a privilege for those who held land as a tenant-in-chief from the King per baroniam – that is to say, under the feudal contract wherein a King's Baron was responsible for raising knights and troops for the royal military service. Certain other office-holders such as senior clerics and Freemen of the Cinque Ports were deemed barons.

This right, entitlement or "title" began to be granted by decree in the form of a Writ of Summons from 1265 and by Letters Patent from 1388. Additionally, many holders of smaller fiefdoms per baroniam ceased to be summoned to parliament, resulting in baronial status becoming personal rather than territorial. Feudal baronies had always been hereditable by primogeniture, but on condition of payment of a fine, termed "relief", derived from the Latin verb levo to lift up, meaning a "re-elevation" to a former position of honour. Baronies and other titles of nobility became unconditionally hereditable on the abolition of feudal tenure by the Tenures Abolition Act of 1660, and non-hereditable titles began to be created in 1876 for Law Lords, and in 1958 for Life Peers.

Ranks

Peers are of five ranks, in descending order of hierarchy:
 Duke comes from the Latin dux, meaning 'leader'. The first duke in a peerage of the British Isles was created in 1337. The feminine form is Duchess.
 Marquess comes from the French marquis, which is a derivative of marche or march. This is a reference to the borders ('marches') between England, Scotland, and Wales, a relationship more evident in the feminine form, Marchioness. The first marquess in a peerage of the British Isles was created in 1385.
 Earl comes from the Old English or Anglo-Saxon eorl, meaning a military leader. The meaning may have been affected by the Old Norse jarl, meaning a free-born warrior or nobleman, during the Danelaw, thus giving rise to the modern sense. Since there was no feminine Old English or Old Norse equivalent for the term, 'Countess' is used (Earls are analogous to the Continental 'Counts'), from the Latin comes. The rank was created circa 800–1000.
 Viscount comes from the Latin vicecomes, meaning 'vice-count'. The rank was created in 1440. The feminine form is Viscountess.
 Baron comes from the Old Germanic baro, meaning 'freeman'. The rank was created in 1066. In the Peerage of Scotland alone, a holder of the fifth rank is not called a 'Baron' but rather a 'Lord of Parliament'. Barons in Scotland were traditionally holders of feudal dignities, not peers, but they are considered minor barons and are recognized by the crown as noble. The feminine form is Baroness. The title of Baron is the only possible rank of a life peerage, a life peerage being a considerably lesser honour than a hereditary peerage.

Baronets, while holders of hereditary titles, are not peers since baronetcies have never conferred noble status, although socially they are regarded as part of the aristocracy. Knights, dames and holders of other British non-hereditary chivalric orders, decorations, and medals are likewise not peers.

Form of title 
The titles of peers are in the form of "(Rank) (TitleName)" or "(Rank) of (TitleName)". The name of the title can either be a place name or a surname or a combination of both (e.g. The Duke of Norfolk or The Earl Spencer). The precise usage depends on the rank of the peerage and on certain other general considerations. For instance, Dukes always use "of". Marquesses and Earls whose titles are based on place names normally use "of" (e.g. The Marquess of Bute and The Marquess of Ailsa), while those whose titles are based on surnames normally do not (e.g. The Marquess Curzon of Kedleston and The Earl Alexander of Tunis). Viscounts, Barons and Lords of Parliament generally do not use "of". However, there are several exceptions to the rule. For instance, Scottish vicecomital titles theoretically include "of", though in practice it is usually dropped (e.g. "The Viscount of Falkland" is commonly known as the "Viscount Falkland".)

Multiple, compound and other names 
While surnames and place names have been commonly used for peerage titles, it is also possible to create other forms of title. For instance, existing double-barrelled surnames have been used for titles (e.g. The Baroness Burdett-Coutts and The Baroness Spencer-Churchill) and other double-barrelled surnames have been created for peerages themselves (e.g. The Lord George-Brown). In a similar way, some peerage titles have been invented by combining surnames (e.g. The Viscount Leverhulme was invented by William Lever by combining his and his wife's surname of Hulme) or combining other names (e.g. The Viscount Alanbrooke which was created by Alan Brooke by combining his first and last names).

"Multiple" and "compound" peerage titles have also evolved. A single individual can accumulate, by achievements or by inheritance, more than one peerage (of the same rank) and be known by a 'compound' of these titles (e.g. "The Duke of Buccleuch and Queensberry'" even though these peerages were originally created separately (i.e. the Dukedom of Buccleuch (created in 1663) and the Dukedom of Queensberry (created in 1684) but unified in the person of Henry Scott, 3rd Duke of Buccleuch and 5th Duke of Queensberry and his descendants).

On the other hand, a "compound" peerage refers to a title specifically created as a compound of two or more names, such as Baron Saye and Sele (created in 1440) and Baron Brougham and Vaux (created in 1830). The last hereditary compound titles to be created (for each rank) were the Duke of Clarence and Avondale (created in 1890), the Marquess of Aberdeen and Temair (created in 1916), the Earl of Strathmore and Kinghorne (created in 1937), the Viscount Newry and Mourne (created in 1822) and the Baron Dalling and Bulwer (created in 1871).

Geographic association 
A territorial designation is often added to the main peerage title, especially in the case of barons and viscounts: for instance, The Baroness Thatcher, of Kesteven in the County of Lincolnshire, or The Viscount Montgomery of Alamein, of Hindhead in the County of Surrey. Any designation after the comma does not form a part of the main title. Territorial designations in titles are not updated with local government reforms, but new creations do take them into account. Thus there is The Baron Knollys, of Caversham in the County of Oxford (created in 1902), and The Baroness Pitkeathley, of Caversham in the Royal County of Berkshire (created in 1997).

It was once the case that a peer administered the place associated with his title (such as an earl administering a county as high sheriff or main landowner), but lordships by tenure have not been commonplace since the early Norman period. The only remaining peerages with certain associated rights over land are the Duchy of Cornwall (place), which appertains to the Dukedom of Cornwall, held by the eldest son and heir to the Sovereign, and the Duchy of Lancaster (place), which regular income (revenue) appertains to the Dukedom of Lancaster, held by the Sovereign whose government owns the capital and all capital gains on disposals. In both cases due to the particular function of bona vacantia in these areas, these titles afford rights encompassing the whole territorial designation of the holder, donated by the holder now to registered charities. Separate estates, smaller than counties, form the bulk of the two duchies.

Types of peers

Hereditary peers 

A hereditary peer is a peer of the realm whose dignity may be inherited; those able to inherit it are said to be "in remainder". Hereditary peerage dignities may be created with writs of summons or by letters patent; the former method is now obsolete. Writs of summons summon an individual to Parliament, in the old feudal tradition, and merely implied the existence or creation of an hereditary peerage dignity, which is automatically inherited, presumably according to the traditional medieval rules (male-preference primogeniture, like the succession of the British crown until 2011). Letters patent explicitly create a dignity and specify its course of inheritance (usually agnatic succession, like the Salic Law). Some hereditary titles can pass through and vest in female heirs in a system called coparcenary.

Once created, a peerage dignity continues to exist as long as there are surviving legitimate descendants (or legitimate agnatic descendants) of the first holder, unless a contrary method of descent is specified in the letters patent. Once the heirs of the original peer die out, the peerage dignity becomes extinct. In former times, peerage dignities were often forfeit by Acts of Parliament, usually when peers were found guilty of treason. Often, however, the felonious peer's descendants successfully petitioned the Sovereign to restore the dignity to the family. Some dignities, such as the Dukedom of Norfolk, have been forfeit and restored several times. Under the Peerage Act 1963 an individual can disclaim his peerage dignity for his own lifetime within one year of inheriting it.

When the holder of a peerage succeeds to the throne, the dignity "merges in the Crown" and ceases to exist.

All hereditary peers in the Peerages of England, Scotland, Great Britain, and the United Kingdom were entitled to sit in the House of Lords, subject only to qualifications such as age and citizenship, but under section 1 of the House of Lords Act 1999 they lost this right. The Act provided that 92 hereditary peers — the Lord Great Chamberlain and the Earl Marshal, along with 90 others exempted through standing orders of the House — would remain in the House of Lords in the interim, pending any reform of the membership to the House. Standing Order 9 provides that those exempted are 75 hereditary peers elected by other peers from and by respective party groups in the House in proportion to their numbers, and fifteen chosen by the whole House to serve as officers of the House.

Representative peers 

From 1707 until 1963, Scottish peers elected 16 representative peers to sit in the House of Lords. Since 1963, they have had the same rights as Peers of the United Kingdom. From 1801 until 1922, Irish peers elected 28 representative peers to sit in the House of Lords.  Since 1922, when the Irish Free State became a separate country, no Irish representative peers have been elected, though sitting members retained their seats for life.

Life peers 

Apart from hereditary peerages, there exist peerages that may be held for life and whose title cannot be passed onto someone else by inheritance. The Appellate Jurisdiction Act 1876 and the Life Peerages Act 1958 authorise the regular creation of life peerages, with the right to sit in the House of Lords. Life peers created under both acts are of baronial rank and are always created under letters patent.

Since the loss of the right of hereditary peers to sit in the House of Lords as a result of the House of Lords Act 1999, the majority of the House of Lords is made up of life peers. There is no limit on the number of peerages the sovereign may create under the Life Peerages Act. Normally life peerages are granted to individuals nominated by political parties or by the House of Lords Appointments Commission, and in order to honour retiring politicians, current senior judges, and senior members of the armed forces.

Until the formal opening of the Supreme Court of the United Kingdom on 1 October 2009, life peers created under the Appellate Jurisdiction Act were known as "Lords of Appeal in Ordinary" or in common parlance "Law Lords". They performed the judicial functions of the House of Lords and served on the Judicial Committee of the Privy Council. They remained peers for life, but ceased to receive judicial salaries at the age of 75. Under the terms of the Act, there may be no more than 12 Lords of Appeal in Ordinary under the age of 75 at one time. However, after the transfer of the judicial functions of the Lords to the Supreme Court of the United Kingdom, the Act ceased to have meaningful effect.

Under the House of Lords Reform Act 2014 and the House of Lords (Expulsion and Suspension) Act 2015 a life peer may lose membership of the House of Lords permanently in one of four ways:
 Resignation or retirement effected by writing to the Clerk of the Parliaments;
 Automatic expulsion through failing to attend a single sitting of the House throughout a whole session of more than six months’ duration without leave of absence, being suspended for that session or being exempted by the House for special circumstances;
 Automatic expulsion through conviction of a criminal offence where the punishment is imprisonment for more than one year;
 Expulsion by resolution of the House.

While these provide for non-membership of the House of Lords, they do not allow a life peer to disclaim their peerage in the same way that a hereditary peer can disclaim theirs.

Styles and titles 

Dukes use His Grace, Marquesses use The Most Honourable and other peers use The Right Honourable. Peeresses (whether they hold peerages in their own right or are wives of peers) use equivalent styles.

In speech, any peer or peeress except a Duke or Duchess is referred to as Lord X or Lady X. The exception is a suo jure baroness (that is, one holding the dignity in her own right, usually a life peeress), who may also be called Baroness X in normal speech, though Lady X is also common usage. Hence, The Baroness Thatcher, a suo jure life peeress, was referred to as either "Baroness Thatcher" or "Lady Thatcher". "Baroness" is incorrect for female holders of Scottish Lordships of Parliament, who are not Baronesses; for example, the 21st Lady Saltoun is known as "Lady Saltoun", not "Baroness Saltoun".

A peer is referred to by his peerage even if it is the same as his surname, thus the Baron Owen is "Lord Owen" not "Lord David Owen", though such erroneous forms are commonly used.

Some peers, particularly life peers who were well known before their ennoblement, do not use their peerage titles.  Others use a combination: for example, the author John Julius Norwich was John Julius Cooper, 2nd Viscount Norwich.

Individuals who use the style Lord or Lady are not necessarily peers. Children of peers use special titles called courtesy titles. The heir apparent of a duke, a marquess, or an earl generally uses his father's highest lesser peerage dignity as his own. Hence, The Duke of Devonshire's son is called the Marquess of Hartington. Such an heir apparent is called a courtesy peer, but is a commoner until such time as he inherits (unless summoned by a writ in acceleration).

Younger sons of dukes and marquesses prefix Lord to their first names as courtesy titles while daughters of dukes, marquesses and earls use Lady. Younger sons of earls and children of viscounts, barons and lords of Parliament use The Honourable.

Divorced peeresses "cannot claim the privileges or status of Peeresses which they derived from their husbands". While a divorced former wife of a duke is no longer a duchess, she may still use the title, styled with her forename prefixed to the title (without the definite article, the). Her forename is used primarily to differentiate her from any new wife of her former husband. However, should the former husband remain unmarried, the former wife may continue to use the title without her forename attached. Should a former wife of a peer remarry, she would lose the style of a divorced peeress and take on a style relating to her new husband. Examples include Louise Timpson, who during her marriage to The Duke of Argyll was known as Her Grace The Duchess of Argyll but became Louise, Duchess of Argyll following her divorce, a style which she eventually lost after her subsequent marriage upon which she became known as Mrs. Robert Timpson.

Precedence 

Peers are entitled to a special precedence because of their ranks. Wives and children of peers are also entitled to a special precedence because of their station.

The Sovereign may, as fount of honour, vary the precedence of the peers or of any other people. For example, Elizabeth II granted her husband, Prince Philip, Duke of Edinburgh, precedence immediately following her; otherwise, he would have ranked along with the other dukes of the peerage of the United Kingdom.

General precedence
In England and Wales, the Sovereign ranks first, followed by the Royal Family. Then follow the Archbishops of Canterbury and York, the Great Officers of State and other important state functionaries such as the prime minister. Thereafter, dukes precede marquesses, who precede earls, who precede viscounts, who precede bishops, who precede barons and lords of Parliament.

Within the members of each rank of the peerage, peers of England precede peers of Scotland. English and Scottish peers together precede peers of Great Britain. All of the aforementioned precede peers of Ireland created before 1801. Last come peers of Ireland created after 1801 and peers of the United Kingdom. Among peers of the same rank and Peerage, precedence is based on the creation of the title: those whose titles were created earlier precede those whose titles were created later. But in no case would a peer of a lower rank precede one of a higher rank. For example, the Duke of Fife, the last non-royal to be created a duke, would come before the Marquess of Winchester, though the latter's title was created earlier and is in a more senior peerage (the peerage of England).

The place of a peer in the order for gentlemen is taken by his wife in the order for ladies, except that a Dowager peeress of a particular title precedes the present holder of the same title. Children of peers (and suo jure peeresses) also obtain a special precedence. The following algorithm may be used to determine their ranks:
 Eldest sons of peers of rank X go after peers of rank X−1
 Younger sons of peers of rank X go after eldest sons of peers of rank X−1
 Wives have a precedence corresponding to those of their husbands
 Daughters of peers of rank X go after wives of eldest sons of peers of rank X
Over time, however, various offices were inserted at different points in the order, thereby varying it.

Eldest sons of dukes rank after marquesses; eldest sons of marquesses and then younger sons of dukes rank after earls; eldest sons of earls and then younger sons of marquesses rank after viscounts. Eldest sons of viscounts, younger sons of earls, and then eldest sons of barons, in that order, follow barons, with the Treasurer of the Household, the Comptroller of the Household, the Vice-Chamberlain of the Household and Secretaries of State being interpolated between them and the barons. Younger sons of viscounts, and then younger sons of barons, come after the aforesaid eldest sons of barons, with Knights of the Order of the Garter and Order of the Thistle, Privy councillors and senior judges being intercalated between them and eldest sons of barons.

Children of the eldest son of a peer also obtain a special precedence. Generally, the eldest son of the eldest son of a peer comes immediately before his uncles, while the younger sons of the eldest son of a peer come after them. Therefore, eldest sons of eldest sons of dukes come before younger sons of dukes, and younger sons of eldest sons of dukes come after them, and so forth for all the ranks. Below the younger sons of barons are baronets, knights, circuit judges and companions of the various orders of Chivalry, followed by the eldest sons of younger sons of peers.

Wives of all of the aforementioned have precedence corresponding to their husbands', unless otherwise entitled to a higher precedence, for instance by virtue of holding a certain office. An individual's daughter takes precedence after the wife of that individual's eldest son and before the wives of that individual's younger sons. Therefore, daughters of peers rank immediately after wives of eldest sons of peers; daughters of eldest sons of peers rank immediately after wives of eldest sons of eldest sons of peers; daughters of younger sons of peers rank after wives of eldest sons of younger sons of peers. Such a daughter keeps her precedence if marrying a commoner (unless that marriage somehow confers a higher precedence), but rank as their husband if marrying a peer.

Precedence within Parliament
The order of precedence used to determine seating in the House of Lords chamber is governed by the House of Lords Precedence Act 1539. Precedence as provided by the Act is similar to, but not the same as, the order outside Parliament. The Sovereign, however, does not have the authority to change the precedence assigned by the Act.

Lords Temporal assume precedence similar to precedence outside Parliament. One difference in the precedence of peers relates to the positions of the Great Officers of State and the officers of the Sovereign's Household. Some Great Officers—the Lord Chancellor, the Lord High Treasurer, the Lord President of the Council and the Lord Privy Seal—provided they are peers, rank before all other peers except those who are of the Blood Royal (no precedence is accorded if they are not peers). The positions of the other Great Officers—the Lord Great Chamberlain, the Lord High Constable, the Earl Marshal and the Lord High Admiral—and the officers of the Household—the Lord Steward and the Lord Chamberlain—are based on their respective ranks. Thus, if the Lord Steward were a duke, he would precede all dukes, if a marquess, he would precede all marquesses, and so on. If two such officers are of the same rank, the precedence of the offices (reflected by the order in which they are mentioned above) is taken into account: if the Lord Great Chamberlain and Earl Marshal were both marquesses, for example, then the Great Chamberlain would precede the Earl Marshal, as the former office precedes the latter.

In practice, however, the Act is obsolete, as the Lords do not actually sit according to strict precedence; instead, peers sit with their political parties.

Privilege of peerage 

The privilege of peerage is the body of privileges that belongs to peers, their wives and their unremarried widows. The privilege is distinct from parliamentary privilege, and applies to all peers, not just members of the House of Lords. It still exists, although "occasions of its exercise have now diminished into obscurity."

Although the extent of the privilege has been ill-defined, three features survived to the 20th century: the right to be tried by fellow peers in the Lord High Steward's Court and in the House of Lords (abolished in 1948); the personal right of access to the Sovereign at any time, but this privilege has long been obsolete; and the right to be exempt from civil arrest (a privilege that has been used only twice since 1945). All privileges of a peerage are lost if a peer disclaims his or her peerage under the Peerage Act 1963.

Vestments

Robes

Peerage robes are currently worn in the United Kingdom on ceremonial occasions. They are of two varieties: parliament robes, worn in the House of Lords on occasions such as at a peer's introduction or state opening of parliament, and coronation robes, worn at the coronations of monarchs. The details of the fur on these robes differs according to a peer's rank.

Since the early Middle Ages, robes have been worn as a sign of nobility. At first, these seem to have been bestowed on individuals by the monarch or feudal lord as a sign of special recognition; but in the fifteenth century the use of robes became formalised with peers all wearing robes of the same basic design, though varied according to the rank of the wearer.

Coronets and headgear 

In the United Kingdom, a peer wears his or her coronet on only one occasion: for the monarch's coronation, when it is worn along with coronation robes.

The coronet of a duke or duchess has eight strawberry leaves;
The coronet of a marquess or marchioness has four strawberry leaves and four silver balls (known as "pearls");
The coronet of an earl or countess has eight strawberry leaves and eight "pearls" raised on stalks;
The coronet of a viscount or viscountess has sixteen "pearls" touching one another;
The coronet of a baron or baroness, or lord or lady of parliament in the Scots peerage, has six "pearls", and a plain circlet lacking the gem-shaped chasing of the other coronets.

The robes and coronets used at Elizabeth II's coronation in 1953 cost about £1,250 (roughly £ in present-day terms). (Peers under the rank of an Earl, however, were allowed in 1953 to wear a cheaper "cap of estate" in place of a coronet, as were peeresses of the same rank, for whom a simpler robe was also permitted (a one-piece gown with wrap-around fur cape, designed by Norman Hartnell)).

With the Parliament robe, a black hat was customarily worn. The Wriothesley Garter Book provides a contemporary illustration of the 1523 State Opening of Parliament: the two dukes present are shown wearing coronets with their parliament robes, but the other Lords Temporal are all wearing black hats. The Lords Spiritual are wearing mitres with their distinctive robes. Mitres ceased to be worn after the Reformation, and the wearing of hats in Parliament ceased, for the most part, when wigs came into fashion. They survive today only as part of the dress of Lords Commissioners, when they are worn with the parliamentary robe: a bicorn hat for men (of black beaver, edged with silk grosgrain ribbon) and a tricorne-like hat for women. (The use of these hats at Introductions of peers to the House was discontinued in 1998.)

Heraldry 

Peers are generally entitled to use certain heraldic devices. Atop the arms, a peer may display a coronet. Dukes were the first individuals authorised to wear coronets. Marquesses acquired coronets in the 15th century, earls in the 16th and viscounts and barons in the 17th. Until the barons received coronets in 1661, the coronets of earls, marquesses and dukes were engraved while those of viscounts were plain. After 1661, however, viscomital coronets became engraved, while baronial coronets were plain. Coronets may not bear any precious or semi-precious stones. Generally, only peers may use the coronets corresponding to their ranks. The Bishop of Durham, however, may use a duke's coronet atop the arms as a reference to the historical temporal authority of the Prince-Bishops of Durham.

Peers wear their coronets at coronations. Otherwise, coronets are seen only in heraldic representations, atop a peer's arms. Coronets include a silver gilt chaplet and a base of ermine fur. The coronet varies with the rank of the peer. A member of the Royal Family uses a royal coronet instead of the coronet he or she would use as a peer or peeress.

Ducal coronets include eight strawberry leaves atop the chaplet, five of which are displayed in heraldic representations. Marquesses have coronets with four strawberry leaves alternating with four silver balls, of which three leaves and two balls are displayed. Coronets for earls have eight strawberry leaves alternating with eight silver balls (called "pearls" even though they are not) raised on spikes, of which five silver balls and four leaves are displayed. Coronets for viscounts have 16 silver balls, of which seven are displayed. Finally, baronial coronets have six silver balls, of which four are displayed. Peeresses use equivalent designs, but in the form of a circlet, which encircles the head, rather than a coronet, which rests atop the head.

Peers are entitled to the use of supporters in their achievements of arms. Hereditary supporters are normally limited to hereditary peers, certain members of the Royal Family, chiefs of Scottish Clans, Scottish feudal barons whose baronies predate 1587. Non-hereditary supporters are granted to life peers, Knights of the Garter, Knights of the Thistle, Knights and Dames Grand Cross of the Bath, Knights and Dames Grand Cross of St Michael and St George, Knights and Dames Grand Cross of the Royal Victorian Order, Knights and Dames Grand Cross of the British Empire, and knights banneret.

Peers, like most other armigers, may display helms atop their arms. Helms of peers are depicted in silver and facing the viewer's left. The helm is garnished in gold and the closed visor has gold bars, normally numbering five. Along with the helm, peers use a mantling, one side of which is red and the other a representation of the heraldic fur ermine. The mantling of peers is emblazoned gules, doubled ermine. Peeresses and other female armigers do not bear helms or mantlings.

History 

When William of Normandy conquered England, he divided the nation into many "manors", the owners of which came to be known as barons; those who held many manors were known as "greater barons", while those with fewer manors were the "lesser barons". When Kings summoned their barons to Royal Councils, the greater barons were summoned individually by the Sovereign, lesser barons through sheriffs. In 1254, the lesser barons ceased to be summoned, and the body of greater barons evolved into the House of Lords. Since the Crown was itself a hereditary dignity, it seemed natural for seats in the upper House of Parliament to be so as well. By the beginning of the 14th century, the hereditary characteristics of the Peerage were well developed. The first peer to be created by patent was Lord Beauchamp of Holt in the reign of Richard II.

The modern peerage system is a vestige of the custom of English kings in the 12th and 13th centuries; in the late 14th century, this right (or "title") began to be granted by decree, and titles also became inherited with the rest of an estate under the system of primogeniture.  Non-hereditary positions began to be created again in 1867 for Law Lords, and 1958 generally.

The ranks of baron and earl date to feudal, and perhaps Anglo-Saxon, times. The ranks of duke and marquess were introduced in the 14th century, and that of viscount in the 15th century. While peerages for life were often created in the early days of the peerage, their regular creation was not provided for by Act of Parliament until the Appellate Jurisdiction Act 1876.

Counterparts 
Other feudal monarchies equally held a similar system, grouping high nobility of different rank titles under one term, with common privileges and/or in an assembly, sometimes legislative and/or judicial.

Itō Hirobumi and the other Meiji leaders deliberately modeled the Japanese House of Peers on the House of Lords, as a counterweight to the popularly elected House of Representatives (Shūgiin).

In France, the system of pairies (peerage) existed in two different versions: the exclusive 'old' in the French kingdom, in many respects an inspiration for the English and later British practice, and the very prolific Chambre des Pairs under the Bourbon Restoration (1814–1848).

In Spain and Portugal, the closest equivalent title was Grandee; in Hungary, Magnat.

In the Kingdom of Sicily a peerage was instituted in 1812 in connection with the abolition of feudalism: peers were nominated based on the taxable incomes of their formerly feudal estates.

In the Holy Roman Empire, instead of an exclusive aristocratic assembly, the legislative body was the Imperial Diet, membership of which, expressed by the title Prince of the Holy Roman Empire, was granted to allied princely families (and various minor ones), as well as to Princes of the Church (parallel to the Lords Spiritual) and in some cases was restricted to a collective 'curiate' vote in a 'bench', such as the Grafenbank.

In the medieval Irish nobility, Gaelic nobles were those presented with the White Wand or slat in a formal ceremony, and presented it by another noble. It was the primary symbol of lordship and effectively reserved only for the three tiers of kings (provincial, regional, local) and for those princely and comital families descending from them in control of significant territories. The total number was between 100 and 150 at any time.

See also 

 List of courtesy titles in the peerages of Britain and Ireland
 Aristocracy
 Australian peers
 Baronies created by error
 British honours system
 British nobility
 Cash for Honours
 Canadian Peers and Baronets
 Canadian titles debate
 False titles of nobility
 Forms of address in the United Kingdom
 History of the Peerage
 House of Lords
 Landed gentry
 List of British Jewish nobility and gentry
 List of Irish representative peers
 List of law life peerages (Appellate Jurisdiction Act, 1876)
 List of life peerages (Life Peerages Act, 1958)
 List of spiritual peers
 Orders, decorations, and medals of New Zealand
 Peerage law
 Peerage of England
 Peerage of Ireland
 Peerage of Scotland
 Substantive title
 Upper class
 Welsh peers and baronets

References

Bibliography 
 
 Bush, Michael L. The English Aristocracy: a Comparative Synthesis. Manchester University Press, 1984. Concise comparative historical treatment.
 Farnborough, T. E. May, 1st Baron. (1896). Constitutional History of England since the Accession of George the Third, 11th ed. London: Longmans, Green and Co.
 Paul, James Balfour (ed.). The Scots Peerage Founded on ... Sir Robert Douglas’s Peerage of Scotland. 9v. Edinburgh: David Douglas, 1904–14.
 "Peerage." (1911). Encyclopædia Britannica, 11th ed. London: Cambridge University Press.
 Peerage Act 1963. (1963 c. 48). London: Her Majesty's Stationery Office.
 Plowden. Alison. Lords of the Land. Michael Joseph, 1984.
 Sanford, John Langton and Meredith Townsend. The Great Governing Families of England. 2v. Blackwood & Sons, 1865 (Books for Libraries Press, 1972).

External links 

 Burke's Peerage & Gentry
 Cracroft's Peerage
 Fake titles